Vice Admiral Frederic Abshire Bardshar (20 October 1915 – 13 September 1993) was an American World War II air ace, who later became Commander of United States Navy Task Force 77 and Carrier Division Five during the Vietnam War.

Military career

World War II
During World War II, Lieutenant Commander Bardshar piloted a Grumman F6F-5 Hellcat, and was credited with eight kills at the Philippines during the Battle for Leyte Gulf in 1944. He was made commander of Air Group 27, based aboard .

1960s
From November 1963 to November 1964, Captain Bardshar was the third Commanding Officer of the aircraft carrier . In 1969, Rear Admiral Bardshar led an investigation into the fire aboard the  when a Zuni rocket misfired, resulting in the deaths of 27 crew, and 314 more injured.

Vietnam War
Bardshar commanded the Constellation during the Gulf of Tonkin Incident from which he led the first U.S. attacks on Vietnam. Later he served two tours with the Joint Chiefs of Staff. As Vice Director of Operations he led the planning for Operation Duck Hook to escalate U.S. involvement, eventually denied by President Nixon. As commander of Task Force 77 he was involved in Operation Ivory Coast, to liberate 55 American pilots from Son Tay POW camp. On 20 August 1970, Vice Admiral Bardshar hosted the President of the Philippines, Ferdinand Marcos, aboard the aircraft carrier .

Bardshar died at La Jolla, San Diego, on 13 September 1993.

References

External links
Photo of Bardshar with Marcos

1915 births
1993 deaths
United States Navy personnel of the Vietnam War
American World War II flying aces
Recipients of the Air Medal
Recipients of the Distinguished Flying Cross (United States)
Recipients of the Legion of Merit
Recipients of the Navy Distinguished Service Medal
Recipients of the Silver Star
United States Naval Academy alumni
United States Navy vice admirals
United States Navy pilots of World War II